Heteropternis is a genus of grasshoppers in the family Acrididae, subfamily Oedipodinae, and tribe Epacromiini. The recorded distribution of species in Heteropternis is from Africa and India through to Japan, Malesia, and Papua New Guinea.

Species
The Catalogue of Life lists:
Heteropternis cheesmanae Uvarov, 1935
Heteropternis coerulea Schulthess Schindler, 1899
Heteropternis couloniana Saussure, 1884
Heteropternis descampsi Roy, 1969
Heteropternis guineensis Blanchard, 1853
Heteropternis guttifera Kirby, 1902
Heteropternis latisterna Wang & Xia, 1992
Heteropternis micronus Huang, 1981
Heteropternis minuta Uvarov, 1934
Heteropternis motuoensis Yin, 1984
Heteropternis obscurella Blanchard, 1853
Heteropternis pudica Serville, 1838
Heteropternis pugnax Bolívar, 1912
Heteropternis qinghaiensis Wang & Zheng, 1992
Heteropternis respondens Walker, 1859
Heteropternis robusta Bey-Bienko, 1951
Heteropternis royi Mestre, 1988
Heteropternis rufipes Shiraki, 1910
Heteropternis sarimahii Mahmood, Samira, Salmah & Idris, 2008
Heteropternis thoracica Walker, 1870

References

Acrididae genera
Invertebrates of Southeast Asia